Chachi may refer to:
Chachi people, an indigenous people of Ecuador
Chachi language, the Barbacoan language spoken by them
anything of, from, or related to Chhachh, a region in Punjab, Pakistan
Chhachi dialect, an Indo-Aryan dialect spoken there
Chhachi (Punjabi clan), sub-section of Kohli Khokran clan in India and Pakistan
Chhachi (Pashtun tribe)
Chachi Arcola, character on American television sitcom Happy Days
Chachi Gonzales (born 1996), dancer and member of dance crew I.aM.mE, winners of America's Best Dance Crew (season 6)
Aleks Çaçi (1916–1989), Albanian writer

See also 
Chachi 420, a 1997 Indian film
Chhachi (disambiguation)
Cha Chi Ming

Language and nationality disambiguation pages